Candy is a type of sweet confectionery, typically prepared by dissolving sugar in water or milk and boiling it to concentrate the sugar.

Candy may also refer to:

Name 
 Candy (name), a list of people and fictional characters with the given name, nickname, stage name or surname

Film and TV
 Candy (1968 film), a film based on the Southern and Hoffenberg novel
 Candy (2006 film), a film based on the Davies novel
 Candy (web series), a 2021 Indian web series
 Candy (TV series), a 2022 American television series

Literature
 Candy (manga), a 2007 Japanese yaoi manga
 Candy (Brooks novel), a 2005 novel by Kevin Brooks
 Candy (Southern and Hoffenberg novel), a 1958 novel by Terry Southern and Mason Hoffenberg
 Candy: A Novel of Love and Addiction, a 1998 novel by Luke Davies

Music

Groups
 Candy (band), mid-1980s American power-pop band
 Candy (group), a musical group from Georgia
 Candy (Malaysian band), an all-female rock band
 The Candy Band, an American punk-rock group for children

Albums
 Candy (Chet Baker album) (1985)
 Candy (Con Funk Shun album) (1979)
 Candy (Mandy Moore album) (2005)
 Candy (Lee Morgan album) (1958)
 Candy (EP), by NCT Dream (2022)
 Candy, an album by Con Funk Shun (1979)
 Candy, an compilation album by Jo Stafford (2001)

Songs
 "Candy" (1944 song), a song popularized by Johnny Mercer and Jo Stafford
 "Candy" (Ash song), 2001
 "Candy" (Baekhyun song), 2020
 "Candy" (Foxy Brown song), 2001
 "Candy" (Cameo song), 1986
 "Candy" (Doja Cat song), 2018
 "Candy" (H.O.T. song), 1996; covered by NCT Dream in 2022
 "Candy" / "Molly's Lips", a 1991 split single by the Fluid and Nirvana
 "Candy" (Ken Hirai song), 2009
 "Candy" (Iggy Pop song), 1990
 "Candy" (Koda Kumi song), 2006
 "Candy" (LL Cool J song), 1998
 "Candy" (Mandy Moore song), 1999
 "Candy" (Paolo Nutini song), 2009
 "Candy" (Aggro Santos song), 2010
 "Candy (Drippin' Like Water)", a song by Snoop Dogg, 2006
 "Candy" (Jessica Sutta song), 2014
 "Candy" (Robbie Williams song), 2012
 "Candy" (Rosalía song), 2022
 "Candy", a song by Bikini Kill from Revolution Girl Style Now!, 1991
 "Candy", a song by Crystal Kay from 4 Real, 2003
 "Candy", a song by Enon from Hocus Pocus, 2003
 "Candy", a song by Riyu Kosaka from Begin, 2004
 "Candy", a song by Luv Unlimited in DDRMAX Dance Dance Revolution 6thMix and 7thMIX
 "Candy", a song by the Men from Open Your Heart, 2012
 "Candy", a song by Morphine from Cure for Pain, 1993
 "Candy", a song by the Presidents of the United States of America from their self-titled album, 1995
 "Candy", a song by Will Smith from Big Willie Style, 1997
 "Candy", a song by Machine Gun Kelly from the album Hotel Diablo, 2019
 "Candy", a song by Rico Nasty from the album Nightmare Vacation, 2020

Places
 Crete or Candy, an island
 Kingdom of Kandy or Candy, a kingdom in what is now Sri Lanka
 Candy or Candia, Crete, the former name of Heraklion

Other uses
 Candy (company), an Italian manufacturer of domestic appliances
 Candy (unit), a traditional South Asian unit of mass
 3015 Candy, a main-belt asteroid
 Tropical Storm Candy, a 1968 storm
 Candy, the design code name for the Atari 400 computer

See also

Caddy (disambiguation)
 Cande (disambiguation)
 Candi (disambiguation)
 Candies (disambiguation)
 Candy & Candy, property developers
 Candy Girl (disambiguation)
 Candyman (disambiguation)
 Hard Candy (disambiguation)
 Kandi (disambiguation)
 Kandy (disambiguation)